Tobias Topic (born 23 March 1992), also known mononymously as Topic, is a Croatian-German DJ, producer and musician. His song "Home" was certified platinum in Australia and Germany.

Biography

Early career & Commercial breakthrough with “Home” 

Born in Solingen, Topic is of paternal Croatian descent. He went to a high school in Hessen. At the age of 16, he started using Logic Studio, a digital audio workstation, to produce music with the guidance of a teacher. He started his musical career on social media with the assistance of YouTube musicians who contacted him. Topic's first release, a house song called "Light It Up", was released at the end of 2014 and reached more than one million views on his YouTube channel. In summer 2015, he released his debut album Miles, which charted both German and Austrian charts. 

Topic made the singles charts in both countries in January 2016 with the song "Home" featuring Nico Santos on vocals. In April 2016, the track was released in Australia and reached the 11th place in its charts and went double platinum. He has cited the internet as a source of his success, stating "The Internet has actually brought the world closer together."

In July 2016, the single Find You followed, sung by dutch singer Jake Reese, who has become famous by the dutch edition of X-Factor and a collaboration with Hardwell on his songs Mad World and Run Wild. Already after one week, the song achieved a ranking in the single charts, but couldn't follow the success of his previous single. 

In September 2016, he signed a record deal with Sony Music/ATV. In the same year, Topic received a nomination for the MTV Europe Music Awards in Best German Act.

2017 - 2018: Perfect 
He made the official single charts of Germany and Austria again in 2017 with the track Break My Habits with the vocals of Swedish singer-songwriter Patrik Jean.

On 26 January 2018, Topic collaborated with American Fifth Harmony member and singer Ally Brooke for the single "Perfect". The success of airplay also received attention in the United States, in particular through Brooke's appearance on the TV show Wild 'n Out. For the song, they were nominated for the Teen Choice Award 2018 in the "Electronic / Dance Song" category.

With the track "Sólo Contigo", which was created in collaboration with Juan Magán and German singer Lena Meyer-Landrut, he released a Spanish-language single for the first time in spring 2018. The song The Less I Know followed together with Alexander Tidebrink.

2019: International breakthrough with Breaking Me 
On 19 December 2019, Breaking Me was released as the sixth single in 2019. It is a collaboration with the swedish singer A7S and the first international chart success for Topic after almost two years. The single reached the top 10 positions in Germany, the Netherlands, Austria, Switzerland, Canada, Italy, Australia, New Zealand, Denmark and Ireland.

With "Breaking Me", Topic also reached the top 10 of the British single charts for the first time and achieved his first number one on the Portuguese singles chart. In the US, he dominated the Dance chart for three weeks and ranked #53 on the Billboard Hot 100. The single reached nearly a billion streams on Spotify today and more than five billion streams overall.

2020: Like I Love You & Why Do You Lie To Me 
On 13 March 2020, the second single collaboration with Nico Santos Like I Love You was released. The song was also promoted with a joint live appearance on the famous German tv show Luke! Die Schule und ich at prime time. The single reached rank 24 in the German single charts as well as rank 2 in the airplay charts.

On 28 August 2020, the single "Why Do You Lie to Me" was released. This was the second collaboration of Topic and A7S features American rapper Lil Baby.

2021: "Your Love (9PM)" / My Heart Goes (La Di Da) 
In January 2021, Topic remade ATB's number one hit 9 PM (Till I Come) collaborating with the german producer who had issued the song originally in the 1990s, ATB. Retitled "Your Love (9PM)", the record also features A7S’ soaring vocals (making it their third collaboration) and was released on Positiva Records.The record charted in a number of markets including the top 10 in Germany, Austria, Switzerland and the UK. It is Topics second most successful track to this date and amassed more than 500 million streams on Spotify alone. “Your Love (9PM)” was nominated in the category “International Song of the Year” at the BRIT Awards 2022.

In June 2021, the single Chain My Heart followed together with American popstar and singer Bebe Rexha, making it to #16 at the US Dance charts. On 30 July 2021, the song Drive was released in a collaboration with british electropop band Clean Bandit and british singer Wes Nelson. The song reached rank 17 in the british single charts. Four weeks later, the next composition appeared with british singer Becky Hill. My Heart Goes (La Di Da) was released on 24 August 2021 and reached #11 in the UK charts.

2022: Kernkraft 400 (A Better Day) and further achievements 
On 28 January 2022, Topic released the single In Your Arms (For An Angel) together with Robin Schulz, Nico Santos and Paul van Dyk. This is a new edition of van Dyks For an Angel from 1994. In collaboration with German Popstar Alvaro Soler, the second Spanish-language single Solo Para Ti was released on 22 April 2022.

The track Kernkraft 400 (A Better Day) followed on 17 June 2022 with singer and producer A7S and its core is built on a sample of Zombie Nations Kernkraft 400 from 1999. On 02 September 2022, Topic and the Swedish singer John Martin released the single Follow Me. Topics first club track and release with the label Tomorrowland Music, that worked with renown artists like Martin Garrix and Felix Jaehn before. Topic states: “[...] John Martin is an incredible artist with huge credibility in the scene. One of my all time favorite tracks and a big inspiration is ‘Don’t You Worry Child’, so I’m incredibly honored that I had the chance to work with him. It’s great to now be able to unfold into a new direction musically and I am really looking forward to what is yet to come!” 

Topic was also part of the “Top 100 DJs 2022” from DJ Mag. After an impressive festival season, two diamond certifications in 28 countries and two awards in 2020 and 2021, he was able to secure rank 69.

Documentary with Tomorrowland: We Are Tomorrow

Topic was part of the documentary We Are Tomorrow from Tomorrowland, that was published on YouTube on 20 September 2022. The four protagonists Topic, Gaggan Anand, Kelly De Clercq and Vicky Tah were filmed and interviewed on their road to Tomorrowland. In the documentary, Topic's live performance and career are displayed and he talks about his idea of a new edition of the hit "Breaking Me" with the new title "Saving Me", as the soundtrack of the documentary with American singer-songwriter Sasha Alex Sloan.

Discography

Albums

Singles

Remixes 
 2020: Surf Mesa featuring Emilee – "ILY (I Love You Baby)" 
2020: Masn and B-Case - "Psycho!" 
2020: Becky Hill and Sigala - "Heaven on My Mind" 
2020: Dennis Lloyd - "Alien" 
2020: Clean Bandit, Mabel, and 24kGoldn - "Tick Tock" 
2021: Moby featuring Gregory Porter and Amythyst Kiah - "Natural Blues" 
2021: Regard, Troye Sivan and Tate McRae - "You" 
2021: Clean Bandit and Topic featuring Wes Nelson - "Drive" 
2022: Lewis Thompson and David Guetta - "Take Me Back" (Topic Remix)
2022: Kamrad, Topic and Max Bering - "I Believe" (Topic Remix)

Awards and nominations

References

German DJs
1993 births
Living people
People from Solingen
Electronic dance music DJs
German people of Croatian descent
Remixers